The Dragons Tail is an  elevation ridge located in the Lewis Range, of Glacier National Park in the U.S. state of Montana. It is situated on the Continental Divide, on the border shared by Flathead County and Glacier County. It can be seen from the Hidden Lake overlook along with its nearest higher neighbor, Bearhat Mountain,  to the northwest.

Climate
Based on the Köppen climate classification, Dragons Tail is located in an alpine subarctic climate zone with long, cold, snowy winters, and cool to warm summers. Temperatures can drop below −10 °F with wind chill factors below −30 °F. Precipitation runoff from the west side of the ridge drains into creeks which empty into Lake McDonald, and the east side drains into the St. Mary River.

Geology

Like other mountains in Glacier National Park, Dragons Tail is composed of sedimentary rock laid down during the Precambrian to Jurassic periods.

Gallery

See also
 Geology of the Rocky Mountains
 List of mountains and mountain ranges of Glacier National Park (U.S.)

References

External links
 2020 fatality

Lewis Range
Mountains of Flathead County, Montana
Mountains of Glacier County, Montana
Mountains of Glacier National Park (U.S.)
Mountains of Montana
North American 2000 m summits